Donald James Cannon (December 8, 1919 – March 5, 1998) was a member of the Utah House of Representatives from 1957 to 1959.  He was also the Republican candidate for Governor of Utah in 1964 and ran unsuccessfully for mayor of Salt Lake City in 1967.  He also coined the Utah slogan "the greatest snow on earth."

Biography
Cannon was the son of Sylvester Q. Cannon and the husband of Elaine A. Cannon.  James Cannon served as a Mormon missionary in Hawaii.

Cannon's Mormon Essays were published by Deseret Book in 1970.  He also wrote a history of Sugar House, Utah.

Cannon also served as the executive director of the Utah Travel Council.  It was in this position that he coined Utah's slogan.

Cannon was an alumnus of the University of Utah.

Sources 
 
 Lambert, Maurice Reed. Scott R. Lambert, ed. All is Well, Mission to the Hawaiian Islands: 1941-44. p. 101
 political graveyard bio on Cannon
 Deseret News obituary

1919 births
1998 deaths
20th-century Mormon missionaries
American Mormon missionaries in the United States
Cannon family
Republican Party members of the Utah House of Representatives
Mormon missionaries in Hawaii
University of Utah alumni
American people of Manx descent
20th-century American politicians
Latter Day Saints from Utah